"We Wish You a Merry Christmas" is a popular secular English carol from the West Country of England.

We Wish You a Merry Christmas may also refer to:

 We Wish You a Merry Christmas (Ray Conniff album), 1962
 We Wish You a Merry Christmas (Take 6 album), 1999 
 We Wish You a Merry Christmas (video game), a 2009 Wii game